This is a list of computer graphics and descriptive geometry topics, by article name.
 2D computer graphics
 2D geometric model
 3D computer graphics
 3D projection
 Alpha compositing
 Anisotropic filtering
 Anti-aliasing
 Axis-aligned bounding box
 Axonometric projection
 Bézier curve
 Bézier surface
 Bicubic interpolation
 Bilinear interpolation
 Binary space partitioning
 Bitmap graphics editor
 Bounding volume
 Bresenham's line algorithm
 Bump mapping
 Collision detection
 Color space
 Colour banding
 Computational geometry
 Computer animation
 Computer-generated art
 Computer painting
 Convex hull
 Curvilinear perspective
 Cylindrical perspective
 Data compression
 Digital raster graphic
 Dimetric projection
 Distance fog
 Dithering
 Elevation
 Engineering drawing
 Flat shading
 Flood fill
 Geometric model
 Geometric primitive
 Global illumination
 Gouraud shading
 Graphical projection
 Graphics suite
 Heightfield
 Hidden face removal
 Hidden line removal
 High-dynamic-range rendering
 Isometric projection
 Lathe (graphics)
 Line drawing algorithm
 Linear perspective
 Mesh generation
 Motion blur
 Orthographic projection
 Orthographic projection (geometry)
 Orthogonal projection
 Perspective (graphical)
 Phong reflection model
 Phong shading
 Pixel shaders
 Polygon (computer graphics)
 Procedural surface
 Projection
 Projective geometry
 Quadtree
 Radiosity
 Raster graphics
 Raytracing
 Rendering (computer graphics)
 Reverse perspective
 Scan line rendering
 Scrolling
 Technical drawing
 Texture mapping
 Trimetric projection
 Vanishing point
 Vector graphics
 Vector graphics editor
 Vertex shaders
 Volume rendering
 Voxel

See also 
 List of geometry topics
 List of graphical methods

Computing-related lists
Mathematics-related lists